Eliseo Vivas (July 13, 1901 – August 28, 1991)  was a 20th-century philosopher and literary theorist.

As a child, his family fled Colombia in response to the presidency of Cipriano Castro. They went to Curacao, then Paris, then, in 1915, to New York City. Vivas served as the Venezuelan consul in Philadelphia, then turned to academia studying or teaching at, among other schools, the University of Wisconsin, the University of Chicago, Ohio State University, Northwestern University, Rockford College, and the University of Iowa.

Vivas's philosophy was essentially conservative, and he relied on poetry as metaphysics while abandoning naturalism. He arrived at his conclusions after trying on many schools, "from Marxism to conservatism, and from naturalism to value realism."

His papers are collected by Northwestern University.

Books

 1950 The Moral and the Ethical Life
 1955 Creation and Discovery
 1960 D. H. Lawrence, the Failure and the Triumph of Art
 1963 The Artistic Transaction and Essays on Theory of Literature
 1971 Contra Marcuse
 1979 Two Roads to Ignorance

References

External links 

1901 births
1991 deaths
Colombian emigrants to the United States
20th-century American philosophers
Northwestern University faculty